Marconia is a town in the region of Basilicata, Italy.

Marconia may also refer to:

 1332 Marconia, a dark asteroid and the parent body of the Marconia family
 Marconia family
 Marconia (gastropod)
 Marconia, a U.S. fishing vessel shipwrecked in 1962

See also
 Marconi (disambiguation)